The inaugural edition of the Wantok Cup was held during Independence Day celebrations in Honiara, Solomon Islands, from 3 to 7 July 2008.

The hosts were represented by two teams, while Papua New Guinea and Vanuatu were initially scheduled to enter one team each. Papua New Guinea withdrew at the last moment, citing "financial problems".

The Solomon Islands U23 became the first Wantok Cup champions, on home ground.

The second Wantok Cup was scheduled to be held later the same month, during Independence Day celebrations in Vanuatu. The event was cancelled for financial reasons, and the second edition of the Wantok Cup was rescheduled to be held in Vanuatu in July 2010. There is no record of it having been held, making the inaugural edition the only competition to date.

Schedule and results

Table

See also
 Wantok Cup
 July 2008 second Wantok Cup
 July 2010 Wantok Cup

External links
 "Vanuatu at full strength for Wantok Cup", Oceania Football Confederation, 1 July 2008
 "Final match to decide Wantok Cup winner", Oceania Football Confederation, 7 July 2008

Notes and references

2008
2008
2007–08 in OFC football
2008 in Solomon Islands sport